Gideon Gross is an Israeli immunologist, inventor and farmer. Together with Zelig Eshhar at the Weizmann Institute of Science, they created the first chimeric antigen receptors (CARs). He was dean of the Faculty of Sciences & Technology of Tel-Hai Academic College from 2010 to 2014. He is also a specialist mango farmer.

References

Living people
Year of birth missing (living people)
Israeli immunologists
Israeli inventors
Israeli farmers
Academic staff of Weizmann Institute of Science
Academic staff of Tel-Hai Academic College